Mas'ud Yunus (1 January 1952 – 27 August 2020) was an Indonesian politician. He was born in Mojokerto, East Java. Yunus was a member of the Democratic Party of Struggle. Between 2013 and 2018, he was mayor of Mojokerto.

Yunus died from COVID-19 at a hospital in Mojokerto on 27 August 2020, during the COVID-19 pandemic in Indonesia aged 68.

References

1952 births
2020 deaths
Deaths from the COVID-19 pandemic in Indonesia
People from Mojokerto
Mayors of places in Indonesia